Li Yundi (born 7 October 1982) is a Chinese concert pianist popularly known as Yundi (stylized as YUNDI) and formerly Yundi Li. Li is best known for being the youngest pianist, at the age of 18 in 2000, to win the International Chopin Piano Competition; in 2015 he also served as its youngest-ever juror.

Early life
Li was born in Chongqing, China. Both his father, Li Chuan, and his mother, Zhang Xiaolu, worked for the Chongqing Iron and Steel Company. Despite coming from a family without professional musicians, Li began having formal music education at a very young age. At age three, he was so enchanted by an accordion performance at a shopping mall that he refused to leave. His parents then bought him an accordion. Studying with Tan Jianmin, a local music teacher, Li mastered the instrument so quickly that he won the top prize at the Chongqing Children's Accordion Competition in March 1987. Li began studying piano with Wu Yong at the age of seven. Two years later, Mr Wu introduced him to Dan Zhaoyi, one of China's most renowned piano educators, with whom he would study for nine years. Li's ambition was to become a professional pianist. In 1994, when Mr Dan accepted a job offer from Shenzhen Arts School (Shenzhen, China), Li followed him there to continue his study with him until his triumph at the 2000 International Chopin Piano Competition. Li later studied under Arie Vardi at the Hochschule für Musik, Theater und Medien Hannover in Hannover, Germany, from 2001 to 2006.

Awards
Li has received top awards at various competitions. He won the Children's Piano Competition in Beijing in 1994. In 1995, he was awarded first place at the Stravinsky International Youth Competition. In 1996, he won the Third Class Award in the tenth Hong Kong - Asia Piano Open Competition, the most competitive competition in Asia for international pianists. In 1998, he won the 1998 Missouri Southern International Piano Competition (Junior Division). The next year, he took Third Prize at the International Franz Liszt Piano Competition of Utrecht, as well as being a major winner in the China International Piano Competition. He also won first place at the Gina Bachauer Young Artists International Piano Competition. In October 2000, selected by the Ministry of Culture of the People's Republic of China to represent the country, Li participated in the XIV International Chopin Piano Competition in Warsaw. Li was the first competitor to be awarded the First Prize (the gold medal) in 15 years since Stanislav Bunin won it in 1985. The First Prize is only granted to the top competitor whose performance has met the jury’s expectations.  At 18 years of age, Li was the youngest and the first Chinese winner in the competition's history. Li was also given the "Polonaise award" by the Chopin Society for his performance of a polonaise.

In September 2001, Li sought out pianist Arie Vardi as his mentor, and therefore left his parents' house to study in Hannover, Germany.

In 2005, Li won “Best New Classical Artist” of XM Satellite Radio's First Annual XM Nation Music Awards.

In May 2010, in recognition of his contribution to Polish culture, the Polish Minister of Culture and National Heritage presented Li with a Silver Medal for Merit to Culture - Gloria Artis.

In October 2019, Li was awarded a Gold Medal for Merit to Culture - Gloria Artis by the Polish government.

Career 
Li made his Carnegie Hall debut to great acclaim in June 2003, performing in a concert celebrating the 150th Anniversary of Steinway & Sons. Bernard Holland of the New York Times wrote about Li’s performance: “Yundi Li, a young but seasoned competition gladiator, played Chopin and Liszt with a promising mix of elegance and impetuosity.”  His United States concert debut took place the next month, when he played Chopin's Piano Concerto No. 1 with the Philadelphia Orchestra.
He was also honoured at a special reception at the home of the Chinese Ambassador to the United States, where he performed for various officials of the US State Department.

In 2001 Li became the first Chinese pianist signed by Deutsche Grammophon and had his first album “Yundi Li: Chopin” released on its label. The CD was first released in Japan and warmly welcomed. The Gramophone magazine reviewed this album: “ … his unequivocal triumph is faithfully mirrored on his DG début album in performance after performance. Everything is naturally and enviably proportioned (a rare but necessary attribute in the everelusive Chopin)‚ everything fuelled alike by a style and poise way beyond his teenage years…”

Li's second recording of Liszt on Deutsche Grammophon, for which he exclusively recorded until November 2008, was released in August 2003 and was named "Best CD of the Year" by The New York Times. This album also won the German Echo Album solo award, the Netherlands Edison Award, the Chinese Gold Record Award. Of this recording Harris Goldsmith of Musical America wrote:" (this recording) includes perhaps the finest account of the B-minor Sonata I have ever heard—is, if anything, light years ahead in patrician elegance: exquisite artistry from one of the greatest talents to surface in years—nay, decades." His third recording Chopin: Scherzi/Impromptus, comprising Chopin's four Scherzi and three Impromptus, was released in late 2004. Anthony Tommasini of the New York Times praised this recording for Li's "white-hot virtuosity" and "uncanny clarity". Deutsche Grammophon released his recording of Beethoven Sonatas in late 2012. This recording was chosen as one of Classic FM's "Album of the Year 2013" besides attaining Platinum status in China. He has also given a recital in the renowned Musikverein in Vienna, performing works by Mozart, Scarlatti, Schumann, and Liszt.

In April 2004 Li completed his North American debut recital tour which included sold-out performances in Boston, Vancouver, San Francisco and New York. Li made his New York recital debut at the Metropolitan Museum of Art on April 24, 2004, performing Chopin Scherzos and Liszt Sonata. Reviewing this recital, Allan Kozinn of the New York Times wrote:" Mr. Li deals in a more poetic, deeply considered pianism, delivered without extraneous gestures and body language. One thing Mr. Li showed was that thoughtful interpretation can be every bit as virtuosic and exciting as the showier variety."

Li obtained Hong Kong residency in November 2006, among the first group of successful applicants under the Quality Migrant Admission Scheme

In 2007, Li became the first Chinese pianist to record live with the Berlin Philharmonic Orchestra and Seiji Ozawa. This Deutsche Grammophon release Prokofiev Piano Concerto No. 2 and Ravel Piano Concerto in G Major garnered rave reviews and was a best seller. It was named Editor’s Choice by Gramophone magazine and praised by The New York Times as one of the best classical CDs of the year.

Li is the subject of a 2008 feature-length documentary, "The Young Romantic: A Portrait of Yundi", directed by Barbara Willis Sweete. This documentary "captures the poetic intensity of this young virtuoso as he works with the great Maestro Seiji Ozawa to prepare for his debut with the Berlin Philharmonic Orchestra..."  Also in 2008, he appeared as a Pennington Great Performers series artist with the Baton Rouge Symphony Orchestra.

In January 2010, Li signed an exclusive recording contract with EMI Classics with plans to record the complete works for solo piano by Frédéric Chopin.

Li performed a solo recital at the Royal Festival Hall in London on March 16, 2010. He played a repertoire of Chopin pieces in a sold-out concert.

Signing again with UMG
In May 2012, Li officially signed with Universal Music Group and cooperated with Deutsche Grammophon once again. He then released recordings of Beethoven Piano Sonatas, Beethoven Emperor Concerto and Schumann Fantasie, The Art of Yundi, Chopin Prelude, and Chopin Ballades, Berceuse and Mazurkas.

Li launched his "Piano Dream" national tour in his hometown Chongqing on August 19, 2013, and brought his music to 30 cities in the next 80 days. Most of those cities were second or third tier. In response to questions from the media and the public, Li remarked that it was not degrading for him to perform in second & third tier cities and he didn't mind the less ideal conditions of some concert halls; he simply wanted to provide more people with an opportunity to appreciate the beauty of classical music.

In July 2015 and as featured guest soloist, Li embarked on a nine-concert tour with the National Youth Orchestra of the United States led by celebrated conductor Charles Dutoit. Comprising mainly the orchestra’s debut performances in Asia, the tour started at Purchase College’s Performing Arts Center and ended in Hong Kong. Carnegie Hall was the second stop. The other six concerts were given in Mainland China.

In May 2017, Li attended the opening ceremony of the Yundi Art Museum, located in the Chongqing Huangjueping Piano Museum. It displays several pianos from different stages of Li's career, including his first piano, as well as a collection of his awards, albums and photographs, and a high-tech experience pavilion.

From August 29 to September 5 in 2017, Li led the Warsaw Philharmonic Orchestra on a five-city concert tour in China, performing Chopin Concertos Nos. 1&2 as both the pianist and the conductor. It was Li's first time to pick up the baton. This tour was the first of a series of events commemorating the 100th anniversary of Poland's regained independence.

In November 2017, Li gave a tour playing Mozart's Piano Concerto No. 23 in A major, K 488 with Staatskapelle Dresden in Germany and China. On November 3,  Li performed in a live concert at Beijing National Aquatics Center celebrating the 2017 League of Legends World Championship.

2018 saw Li's successful debut in Australia and New Zealand. In a series of sold-out concerts, Li performed with local orchestras Chopin's Piano Concertos Nos. 1&2 both as a soloist and a conductor.

Signing with Warner Classics
In December 2019, Li signed with Warner Classics. He soon released a new album on its label, Chopin’s Piano Concertos Nos. 1 & 2, in January 2020. In this recording, he not only played the piano, but also conducted the Warsaw Philharmonic Orchestra from the piano bench. This album was chosen by Donald Vroon of the American Record Guide as one of the "Best of 2020". The International Piano Magazine reviewed this recording:" This is aristocratic Chopin, unfailing in its clarity, elegance and unforced eloquence. Nothing is over-played, everything is expressed. Yundi Li ranks among the finest, his reading of the F minor Concerto’s central love song hauntingly inward looking. The Warsaw Philharmonic offer stout support, and sound and balance are exemplary."

In 2021, he joined the cast of Call Me By Fire as a contestant. He was subsequently eliminated in episode 7, then returned in episode 10, only to be withdrawn after episode 11 in light of recent controversies.

Philanthropy 
"Charity is just like music which comes from deep inside my heart. I can express my love for society and my country through my fingers, just like Chopin did." Li told reporters at a press conference before giving a charity piano recital in Beijing on January 11, 2011, for the individuals and companies that had contributed to the efforts of the Red Cross Society of China in 2010. During the recital, Li was honored as the Music Ambassador of the Chinese Red Cross Foundation.

In 2001, Li donated a portion of the sales revenue of his first CD “Yundi Li: Chopin” to United Nations Children's Fund, aiming to benefit children living in China’s economically disadvantaged areas.

Soon after the 2008 Sichuan Earthquake, Li performed in a fundraising concert in Beijing, along with several other famous musicians of Sichuan origin. Funds raised at the concert were donated to helping rebuild schools in Wenchuan County and providing mental healing services for children affected by the earthquake. On November 29, 2008, right before the International Day of Persons with Disabilities, Li headlined a charity concert held in the Bird’s Nest Stadium to support people disabled by the earthquake.

Joining forces with I DO Fund of China Charity Federation  in 2016, Li helped build the first music classroom and library for Puma Jiangtang Elementary School, the school with the highest altitude (5373 meters) in Tibet. The music classroom was named after Li. At the opening ceremony on September 1, also the first day of the new school year, Li taught the Tibetan children to play the piano hoping to help them open the door to music exploration.

Controversy 
On 30 October 2015, Li performed Chopin's Piano Concerto No. 1 in Seoul, Korea. Li made many mistakes during the performance of the concerto, and the orchestra had to stop playing for approximately 10 seconds. Li later did not perform encore and cancelled his post-performance autograph session. Li's performance received overwhelming criticism from the audience. Li later provided an apology through his Weibo account for the mistakes he made, and thanked the orchestra and conductor.

On 21 October 2021, after a tip-off by public informants referred to as the Chaoyang masses, Li was detained by Beijing police for allegedly hiring a prostitute. Under Chinese law, Li can be detained for up to 15 days and fined up to 5000 yuan ($782) for illegally soliciting a sex worker. The Chinese Musicians' Association subsequently declared that it would revoke Li's membership. Jerome A. Cohen, a New York University law professor specializing in the Chinese law, called the "lack of transparency" about his case "concerning", noting that prostitution is a "time-honored Communist Party claim against political opponents". According to The Guardian, there has thus far been no evidence that indicates the detention is politically motivated.

On 16 March 2022, the US Department of Justice released a document  that includes a detail suggesting "the derogatory information regarding the Pianist may have been manufactured". Multiple news sources reported that "the Pianist" is an apparent reference to Li Yundi.

Recordings

References

External links

 Official website 
 Yundi Li at Deutsche Grammophon

1982 births
Living people
20th-century Chinese musicians
20th-century classical pianists
20th-century male musicians
21st-century Chinese musicians
21st-century classical pianists
21st-century male musicians
Child classical musicians
Chinese classical pianists
Chinese philanthropists
Deutsche Grammophon artists
EMI Classics and Virgin Classics artists
Hochschule für Musik, Theater und Medien Hannover alumni
International Chopin Piano Competition winners
Male classical pianists
Musicians from Chongqing
People's Republic of China musicians
People with acquired residency of Hong Kong
Recipients of the Silver Medal for Merit to Culture – Gloria Artis